Johnsrud is a Norwegian surname. Notable people with the surname include:

DuWayne Johnsrud (born 1943), American politician and farmer
Martin Johnsrud Sundby (born 1984), Norwegian cross-country skier
Nina Johnsrud (born 1959), Norwegian journalist 

Norwegian-language surnames